The  or Thuringian Forest Donkey is a recently-created German breed of domestic donkey.

History 

Seven jennies and two jacks were registered in the stud-book. As there are very few of the donkeys, the breed is reported to DAD-IS as critically endangered.

Characteristics 
The Thüringer Waldesel is of medium size. Jacks stand 100–110 cm at the withers, and weigh about 133–210 kg; jennies stand some 95–110 cm, and weigh 156–185 kg. The coat is usually stone-grey, with dark shoulder-stripe and eel stripe; the legs often display zebra stripes.

References

Animal breeds originating in Germany
Donkey breeds